Five ships of the Royal Navy have been named Harpy.

  was launched at Liverpool, the Navy having purchased her on the stocks. In 1799 she was converted to a fireship. The Navy sold her in 1783 and she became a whaler and a merchantman sailing for the Sierra Leone Company. The French Navy captured her in 1794 and they employed her as Harcourt and later Hardie. The French Navy struck her from the lists in 1796.
  – a brig-sloop in service 1796–1817.
  – a brig-sloop in service 1825–1841
  – a gunboat in service 1845–1892
  – a  torpedo boat destroyer in service 1910–1921

See also
  – a cutter in service 1816–1848.

References

 

Royal Navy ship names